Anthony Stewart (born 5 March 1979) is an English former rugby league footballer who played in the 1990s, 2000s and 2010s.

Background
Stewart was born in Wigan, Greater Manchester, England.

He has a wife, Dawn Louise Stewart (married 2017) and one child, Abigail Juliet Stewart (born 9 June 2008).

Playing career
He began playing at Hindley Juniors before joining Saints. Having won the 1999 Championship, St. Helens contested in the 2000 World Club Challenge against National Rugby League Premiers the Melbourne Storm, with Stewart playing from the interchange bench in the loss.  As Super League V champions, St. Helens played against 2000 NRL Premiers, the Brisbane Broncos in the 2001 World Club Challenge. Stewart played from the interchange bench in Saints' victory. Stewart played for St. Helens on the wing in their 2002 Super League Grand Final victory against the Bradford Bulls. Having won Super League VI, St Helens contested the 2003 World Club Challenge against 2002 NRL Premiership-winners, the Sydney Roosters. Stewart played on the wing in Saints' 38–0 loss.

Anthony signed for Salford City Reds on loan from St. Helens in 2004. He signed permanently in 2005. He was named in the Ireland training squad for the 2008 Rugby League World Cup.

References

External links
Whitehaven profile 
(archived by web.archive.org) Salford Squad Profile: Anthony Stewart
Saints Heritage Society profile

1979 births
Living people
Bradford Bulls players
English people of Irish descent
English rugby league players
Ireland national rugby league team players
Lancashire rugby league team players
Leigh Leopards players
London Broncos players
Rochdale Hornets players
Rugby league players from Wigan
Rugby league wingers
Salford Red Devils players
St Helens R.F.C. players
Swinton Lions players